Klepač may refer to:

 Klepač, North Macedonia, a village near Prilep
 Klepač (surname)